American rapper Megan Thee Stallion has released two studio albums, one compilation album, three mixtapes, three extended plays, thirty-eight singles (including twelve as a featured artist), and two promotional singles. In her early career, Megan Thee Stallion released the non-commercial, SoundCloud-exclusive mixtapes Rich Ratchet (2016) and Megan Mix (2017). She made her official solo debut by commercially releasing her first professional EP, Make It Hot, on September 18, 2017, which was followed by her second EP Tina Snow on December 21, 2018.

As Megan Thee Stallion gained national mainstream popularity in 2019, the single "Big Ole Freak" (from Tina Snow) gave Stallion her first-ever entry on the Billboard Hot 100 and her first single to be certified Platinum by the Recording Industry Association of America. Her first major label mixtape, Fever, was released on May 17, 2019, and peaked at number 10 on the US Billboard 200 making it Stallion's first project to do so. The second single from the mixtape, "Cash Shit", featuring rapper DaBaby, peaked at number 36 on the Hot 100 and topped the US Urban radio chart. In August 2019, Stallion released the single "Hot Girl Summer" featuring Nicki Minaj and Ty Dolla Sign, which peaked at number 11 on the Hot 100 as well as being certified Platinum by the Recording Industry Association of America.

Megan Thee Stallion's third extended play, Suga was released on March 6, 2020. The EP would later peak at number 7 on the Billboard 200, becoming her highest peak on the chart . A remix of the single "Savage" featuring American singer Beyoncé topped the Billboard Hot 100 in May 2020, becoming Stallion's first No. 1 song in her career. She shortly earned her second No. 1 on the chart after featuring on the song "WAP" by rapper Cardi B. The song additionally became Stallion's first No. 1 in countries such as Australia, Canada, Ireland, United Kingdom and New Zealand.

Albums

Studio albums

Compilation albums

Extended plays

Mixtapes

Singles

As lead artist

As featured artist

Promotional singles

Other charted and certified songs

Guest appearances

Notes

References

Discography
Discographies of American artists
Hip hop discographies